Gert Verner Petersen (19 August 1927 – 1 January 2009) was a journalist and politician who helped found and represent the Socialist People's Party in Denmark. He was born in Nykøbing Falster, Denmark, as the son of the factory worker Karen Rolandsen. He got a high school diploma from Nykøbing Katedralskole in 1945 and studied history at the University of Copenhagen.

Political career

Early politics
In 1940 at the age of 13, Gert Petersen was a member of the youth movement of the Nazi National Socialist Workers' Party of Denmark for ten months, as he changed his political views. From 1943, he was an active member of the Danish resistance movement but was eventually captured by the Gestapo in 1944 and incarcerated in the Frøslev Camp until the end of the German occupation of Denmark.

Communist Party of Denmark
He became a member of the Communist Party of Denmark in 1945. He was among those members who wanted to change the party line to a democratic form of socialism. He took part in this debate through the publication "Dialog". When the party line was not changed he followed Aksel Larsen out of the Communist Party and became a co-founder of the Socialist People's Party on 15 February 1959.

Socialist People's Party
He was a member of the party leadership of the party since 1961 and in periods the party's executive committee and its secretariat. He was party chairman in the period 1974 to 1991 where he showed great ability to combine a Marxist analysis with day-to-day politics. Thus his influence was not limited to the Socialist People's Party but reached wide parts of the Danish left wing.

Political legacy
Petersen has influenced his party in three ways:
I. As a person who made a great effort to formulate the political ideology of popular socialism and demarcate the party from the Social Democrats to the right and the Communist Party of Denmark and differing left-wing groups on the left, especially concerning the relationship between socialism and democracy. He took an unconditional stance for a democratic path to socialism.

II. As chairman he represented negotiation instead of confrontation when a minority of the parliamentary group wanted to change the political line to conform more with that of the Social Democrats.

III. As a long-standing proponent for the "worker's majority strategy" which was significant for the policy of the party during the 1980s. A worker's majority is to be understood as a cooperation between the Social Democrats, the Socialist People's Party and the rest of the left-wing which were meant to bring about reforms in the direction of socialism.

Other
After Gert Petersen left parliament, he was an active debater on especially foreign policy and frequently occurred in the debate pages of the newspapers.

His membership of the youth wing of the National Socialist Workers' Party of Denmark was first publicly known in 1977, where the controversial author Erik Haaest revealed Petersen's Nazi past.
At first, Petersen denied his membership among other places in the newspaper BT on 26 August 1977 with the words: "It is pure nonsense and pure lies. I have never been a member of the Nazi party." Later Petersen had to admit that the allegations were true. For many years until the middle of the 1980s he claimed to have been a member of the Nazi party as a "spy". At last he had to admit that he as a boy had been attracted by the social views and Führer principle of the Nazis.

Gert Petersen's relaxed stance on fashion and style was the background for the formation of the "Association for the beautification of Gert Petersen" - an association which rarely achieved its goals. The association, as well as a parody of the Anthem of the Soviet Union called "The Anthem to Gert Petersen", can be seen as examples of the humorous elements of the environment in and around the party.

Codenamed ZEUS by the KGB, Petersen passed on classified information gleaned from the Danish Foreign Policy Committee.

Journalist
He has been
 co-publisher of Dialog 1953-1960
 employed at the party publication SF-bladet 1959-1967, and editor of the publication from 1962–1967
 editor of Her og Nu 1967-1974

Publications
 Vejen til socialismen i Danmark (1960)
 Veje til socialismen i vor tid (1966)
 Om socialismens nødvendighed (1980)
 Om fredens nødvendighed (1981)
 Om nødvendigheden af dansk fredspolitik (1982)
 Verden er ung endnu (1984)
 En ny verdensorden? Ja tak, men en bedre! (1991)
 Indenfor systemet - og udenfor. Erindringer (1998)
 Med frygten som drivkraft. Tanker om den kolde krig''(2001)

See also
Folketinget

References

1927 births
2009 deaths
People from Guldborgsund Municipality
Members of the Folketing
Socialist People's Party (Denmark) politicians
Communist Party of Denmark politicians
Danish resistance members
Leaders of the Socialist People's Party (Denmark)